Tai Nüa (Dehong Dai: ᥖᥭᥰ ᥘᥫᥴ Tai Lə; Chinese: 傣那 Dǎinà) is one of the Tai ethnicities in South East Asia. They are mostly found in the Yunnan Province of China, Laos, Thailand, Burma and Vietnam and some have emigrated to the United States of America. There are however two different groups of Tai people called Tai Nua, one in China and Burma, the other in Laos.

Names
Tai Nua/Lua can be written as Tai Neua, Tai Nuea, Tai Nüa or Dai Nua and sometimes Tai Nau. They are also known as Dehong Dai, Dehong Tailurian and Chinese Shan. The word Nua (Thai: เหนือ Dehong Dai: ᥘᥫᥴ  Lə) in the Tai languages means "north", Tai Nua (Thai: ไทเหนือ Dehong Dai: ᥖᥭᥰ ᥘᥫᥴ  therefore means "Northern Tai" and is used by Tai people to refer to other Tai groups living to the north. However, the naming of the Tai people can be confusing; some publications may also use Dai Kong, Dai Loe, Tai Mao and others, and two different groups of Tai people are called Tai Nua.

History

Tai Neua was one of many ethnics in China who prospered during 17th and 18th century. They came from an area referred to as Muang Neua and were called Tai Muang Neua. The former kingdom of the Tai Nua people had its capital at Muang Boo; other main cities included Muang Khwan, Muang Guoen Mai.

Tai Nua had many warlords of their own which they referred to as Jao Fa (Lord of Sky) There were many Jao Fa or Khun descent to as late as early 19th century. There are still many Tai Nua villages in China that are still preserving their own heritages. Although Tai Nua in China are considered as a small minority group, they still have many of their
relatives living in many countries in South East Asia, Europe and America.

Some of Tai Neua escaped depredation from China during early 19th century and divided into 3 different routes as they reached Laos, Thailand and Burma. Tai Neua in Laos are found in 9 villages, including Ban Koum, Ban Patoy, Ban Nam Keoluang, Ban Siriheuang and Ban Tong Mai. There are as many as 16 villages of Tai Nuea people living in Kiang Tung (Xiang Tung) Burma. Five of the villages located right inside the town of Xiang Tung such as: Xao Paed, Bo Heua, Nong Kham, Pa Laeng and Suan Luang.

Since Laos civil war in the middle of 1960, some Tai Neua had fled Muang Sing to escape newly communist control in Muang Sing to Bokeo province and settled in 25 km to the North of Ban Houeisai called Ban Namkeung Mai. This little slope area along the Mekong river is first settle by Yao or Mien ethnic during the CIA war. Chao La was chief of this village. His family and the families of other Mien officials and military members. Tai Neua fled from Muangsing during 1965 to settle in Nam Keung Mai with few families then when Nam Touiy was lost to communist in early 1973 all of Tai Neua in Nam Touiy fled to join the rest of Tai Nuea in Ban Namkeung Mai. Although, a few families had fled to other countries after Laos lost its war to total communist control in early 1975. Those who fled from Ban Namkeung Mai are now reside in America, France, Switzerland and Canada. Today, more than 30 of Tai Neua families still living in Ban Namkeung Mai, Laos. Ban Namkeung Mai has become the 6th village of Tai Nuea in Laos.

Demographics
Today, most of the Tai Nua people live in China, where they are classified with related Tai peoples as the Dai people, one of the 56 ethnic groups officially recognized by the People's Republic of China. The number is estimated at be around 540,000 in China (2001 census), around 700,000 in total including other countries. The Tai Nua people are Buddhist, but mixed with animism and polytheism.

Language
The Tai Nuea language is closely related to other Tai languages. It has its own scripts, the Tai Le or Dehong Dai script, which is used in Yunnan, China. However, the Tai Nua people of the Houaphanh Province in Laos speak a different dialect from the Tai Nua of Yunnan and Burma; the one spoken in Yunnan is a Southwestern Tai dialect, while the Laotian one has Northern Tai features.

Culture
The Tai Nua people have their own culture, tradition, language and literature. Among their many festivities is the New Year "Jin Leun Sam", which is normally falling on the first day of the third month of lunar calendar. The New year celebration is considered as a very important festival in the Tai Neua tradition. Those living outside of the hometown would return for the celebration with the family and friends.

The festivities could go on a week long with many activities such as riding swing set "Ki Tong Ja", spinning tops and competitions "Toh Mark Khang" and tossing bean bags "Peak Gon". This is the time for all the kids to ask for forgiveness from their elders "Su Ma" by preparing a plate off offering with flowers, candles, incenses. The kids then kneel in front of elders and offer the plate with asking for intentional or unintentional mishaps that they may have imposed upon their elders, then the elders would give them the word of forgiveness and bless them with New Year's blessings and tie their wrists with white string to signify the sacrament of the procession.

It is also the time for Tai Neua people to make traditional cake such as Sesame rice cake "Khao Pook Nga"; rice ball cake "Kao Ke Mah" and people would invite friends and family to join with special meals throughout the week long until the very first day of New Year "Meu Ho Leun Sam" then the festivity will be held at the temple for the big and final celebration with the blessing of the monks.

References

External links
 Noodle making

Tai peoples
Ethnic groups in South Asia
Ethnic groups in China